St. Jude's Church is a place of worship of the Free Presbyterian Church of Scotland on Woodlands Road in Glasgow, Scotland. It is the largest church building of this denomination, constructed circa 1874-6 for the Woodlands United Presbyterian Church, later Woodlands United Free Church.  The Free Presbyterian Bookroom is located in back rooms at the church.

In the early 20th century, in a previous building also known as St Jude's, the name given to it by its previous owners, the congregation had an attendance of over 1,000, and was the largest Free Presbyterian congregation.

References

External links
 Early 20th century picture with description
  Site Record from The Royal Commission on the Ancient and Historical Monuments of Scotland

Churches completed in 1875
Churches in Glasgow
Listed churches in Glasgow
Category B listed buildings in Glasgow
1875 establishments in Scotland
Free Presbyterian Church of Scotland